Enrique Antonio Bradfield Jr. (born December 2, 2001) is an American college baseball outfielder for the Vanderbilt Commodores.

Career
Bradfield attended American Heritage School in Plantation, Florida where he played baseball. In July 2019, he participated in the High School All-Star Game at Progressive Field. During his shortened senior season in 2020, he batted .367 with one home run, ten RBIs, and five stolen bases. He went unselected in the 2020 Major League Baseball draft and enrolled at Vanderbilt University to play college baseball.

Bradfield was immediately inserted into the Vanderbilt starting lineup as a freshman in 2021. Over 67 games, he batted .336 with one home run, 38 RBIs, and 47 stolen bases, which lead the NCAA. He was named the Southeastern Conference Baseball Freshman of the Year as well as First Team All-SEC. Defensively, he had a .992 field percentage, earned a ABCA/Rawlings Gold Glove, and was named to the SEC All-Defensive Team. Bradfield returned as Vanderbilt's starting center fielder in 2022 and was named First Team All-SEC and to the SEC All-Defensive Team for the second consecutive year. Over 62 games, he slashed .317/.415/.498 with eight home runs, 36 RBIs, and 46 stolen bases. He was named to the USA Baseball Collegiate National Team following the season's end. He also played in the Cape Cod Baseball League with the Cotuit Kettleers.

Personal life
Bradfield's father, Enrique Sr., played college baseball at St. Thomas University.

References

External links
Vanderbilt Commodores bio

2001 births
Living people
African-American baseball players
Baseball players from Florida
Baseball outfielders
Vanderbilt Commodores baseball players
All-American college baseball players
United States national baseball team players
Cotuit Kettleers players